Akçakaya is a village in the Gölbaşı District, Adıyaman Province, Turkey. Its population is 155 (2021).

References

Villages in Gölbaşı District, Adıyaman Province